National Route 45 is a national highway in South Korea connects between Seosan and Gapyeong County. It was established on 14 March 1981.

Main stopovers
 South Chungcheong Province
 Seosan - Yesan County - Asan
 Gyeonggi Province
 Pyeongtaek - Anseong - Yongin - Gwangju - Hanam - Namyangju - Gapyeong County

Major intersections

 (■): Motorway
IS: Intersection, IC: Interchange

South Chungcheong Province

Gyeonggi Province

References

45
Roads in South Chungcheong
Roads in Gyeonggi